Arnold Gregory (14 November 1924 – 30 July 1976) was a British textile company worker, lecturer and politician who was a Labour Party Member of Parliament for six years.

Gregory came from a lower-middle-class background and was born in Salford. He went to state schools and the Manchester College of Technology. He became an apprentice engineer and joined the Amalgamated Engineering Union in 1941, joining in addition the Labour Party in  1944. He took extramural courses at the University of Manchester. Working as a Contracts Manager for a textiles company, Gregory became a member of the Clerical and Administrative Workers' Union from 1950.

From 1956, Gregory worked as a Lecturer and Tutor for the National Council of Labour Colleges. He was chosen as Labour candidate for Stafford and Stone in the 1959 general election. At the 1964 general election, he fought the marginal seat of Stockport North and won it from the Conservatives.

Gregory was a low-profile MP who allied with the left wing, opposing British diplomatic support for the United States over the Vietnam war and a negotiated settlement over Rhodesia. He was defeated in the 1970 general election.

References
M. Stenton and S. Lees, "Who's Who of British MPs" Vol. IV (Harvester Press, 1981)

External links 
 

1924 births
1976 deaths
Labour Party (UK) MPs for English constituencies
UK MPs 1964–1966
UK MPs 1966–1970